Bickershaw Colliery was a coal mine, located at Pennington, in Leigh, then within the historic county boundaries of Lancashire, England.

History
Bickershaw is located in the Lancashire Coalfield, and required the sinking of deep shafts to access the coal. However, access to transport via the Leeds and Liverpool Canal at Plank Lane made the distribution of the product relatively easy.

The first shaft at Bickershaw was sunk in 1830 by Turner and Ackers. A tramway connected the pit to the canal which was used for transporting coal until August 1972 when road transport took over local distribution. In 1872 work started on two new shafts; No. 1 and No. 2 at Plank Lane beside the canal. The seams worked from these shafts were the Crombouke, Pemberton Five Feet and the White and Black mines. In 1877 shafts No. 3 and No. 4 (both  in depth), were sunk to the King Coal mine. No. 5 pit was completed before World War I.

Bickershaw Collieries and Abram Collieries amalgamated in 1933 and never were owned by Moss Hall or by the Pearson and Knowles Coal Company. Mining operations at the former Abram Pits ceased in the late 1930s, except for Abram Nos.1&2 pits which were taken over by one Albert Longworth, consequently becoming known as the 'Albert Pit.' This was a drift mine, adjacent to Bolton House Road, continuing in operation until 1965. In 1975 Opencast mining began extracting from the area previously worked by Abram 1 & 2 pits, and a dispatching plant and sidings were erected on the site, worked by the NCB Opencast Executive's Sentinel 0-6-0 diesel shunter, continuing in operation until 1985. During the 1984/5 miners strike loaded MGR wagons were stored in the sidings, and also at nearby Abram North Sidings as the NUR and ASLEF would not allow their members to cross picket lines.

On 10 October 1932, a mine-shaft elevator carrying 20 people fell at the mine, killing all but one person.

In 1933, Abram Colliery closed and its shafts to the Arley mine were taken over by Bickershaw. This consolidation resulted in a modernisation scheme to open up the Peacock and Plodder mines, and an additional area of Wigan seam. By 1937 an electric winder was installed on both shafts, with cages to accept ten-ton capacity skips in No.4.

National Coal Board

Created by Clement Attlee's post-war Labour government to run nationalised industries, the Coal Industry Nationalisation Act 1946 received royal assent on 12 July, and the National Coal Board was formally constituted on 15 July, with Lord Hyndley as Chairman. The number of companies taken over by the board was about two hundred, at a cost of £338 million.

Nationalisation brought about a review of pre-war development plans, which resulted in re-organisation of the pits in the area. In 1960 these tunnels intersected the Crombouke seam, allowing and two more faces to be opened for production. An endless rope haulage was installed and  capacity tubs were introduced to take coal to the skip pockets in No.4 shaft bottom.

The increased coal capacity resulted in the rope haulage system being replaced by a trunk conveying system in the main horizon tunnel, which had been extended to No.4 pit bottom. A 200-ton capacity surge bunker was installed to avoid delays in the event of stoppage at the shaft. A minor re-organisation and efficiency scheme was completed in 1967 which concentrated all production and coal winding in the Nos. 3 and 4 shafts, leaving Nos. 1 and 2 shafts for ventilation purposes.

Bickershaw super pit

In 1973, NCB super-pit development was started. Completed in 1976 at a cost of £3million, it linked Bickershaw underground with the neighbouring Parsonage and Golborne collieries. A surface based electronic control system managed the flow from three pits faces, and monitored underground conditions.
Parsonage continued to be used for winding men and materials but from 1 January 1983, the pit became fully integrated with Bickershaw for administration and management. One coal face was in operation in the Peacock mine and one in the Trencherbone, both fully mechanised and equipped with powered supports. The total combined underground colliery workforce at this point was 550 men.

Additional investment on the surface at Bickershaw resulted in the capability to process one million tons of coal annually. With 90% of combined total production for electricity generation, a £90,000 surface rapid loading system at the Bickershaw coal preparation plant enabled a train of 45 wagons, each capable of holding 30 tons of coal, to be loaded with 1350 tons of coal in less than one and a half hours. These wagons were dispatched to Bickershaw exchange sidings, and onwards to the Central Electricity Generating Board. The residual 10% of production was general, industrial and domestic coal, dispatched via road and the use of canal barges ended.

After the colliery celebrated its centenary in June 1977, with a week of activities and a special open day for visitors, a final development was undertaken.

Closure
After the closure of Golborne Colliery in 1989, the pits production target was set at an increased 20,000 tonnes a week. However, with targets consistently missed, the 600 miners were balloted on a move to give Bickershaw a stay of execution, against British Coal submitting a report showing the colliery to be unprofitable. Resultantly, both Bickershaw and Parsonage Collieries finally closed on 13 March 1992

Colliery Band
After Abram Colliery closed its brass band was taken over by Bickershaw. The band was conducted by Harry Mortimer and won various regional and national trophies.

Transport

All onsite shunting and movement between pit head and the coal washing plant was undertaken by privately owned shunters, the traffic for which greatly increased after the consolidation of coal extraction of the three pits to Bickershaw. Latterly part of the Merry-go-round train system, the trains were most often hauled by a pair of British Rail Class 20 diesel locomotives, en route to Fiddlers Ferry Power Station.

Accidents
Men from Bickershaw attended the Abram Colliery disaster in 1881, in which 81 men died.
September 1847: a collier and his drawer were descending the Bolton House pit when they were engulfed in flames. 1 killed, 1 injured.
10 October 1932: a mine-shaft elevator fell. 19 killed, 1 injured.
18 October 1940: death of Alfred Robert Wilkinson VC from carbon monoxide poisoning
10 October 1959: explosion behind stoppings in the Plodder Seam. 5 killed, 1 injured.

Present day
Managed by English Partnerships, the derelict site became part of a £386.5 million National Coalfields Programme in 1996. In 2005, a discussion was opened with the community on redeveloping the site as a mixed development to create new jobs, homes, leisure facilities and open space. Now named Bickershaw South and owned by the Northwest Regional Development Agency, the site was included as part of the UK Governments Carbon Challenge initiative in 2007 to accelerate the building industry's response to a 2016 target for all new housing to be zero carbon. As a result, a 2MW wind turbine is being built on the adjacent Wigan Council-owned, Bickershaw North site, to provide energy for the development.

See also
List of mining disasters in Lancashire
Glossary of coal mining terminology

References

External links

Bickershaw Colliery by Bernard Platt
Bickershaw Colliery @ ThisIsLancashire.co.uk
 Bickershaw No.4 by Roger Hampson
Pictures of Bickershaw @ WiganWorld.co.uk

Coal mines in Lancashire
Buildings and structures in Leigh, Greater Manchester
Underground mines in England
History of the Metropolitan Borough of Wigan
Demolished buildings and structures in Greater Manchester